The 1989 Westminster Titans football team was an American football team that represented Westminster College of Pennsylvania as an independent during the 1989 NAIA Division II football season. In their 18th season under head coach Joe Fusco, the Titans compiled a perfect 13–0 record.

Schedule

NAIA playoffs

First round vs. Georgetown
In the opening round of the playoffs, Westminster defeated , 29–9, at Memorial Field in New Wilmington. Westminster held Georgetown to six passing yards and 149 rushing yards and forced five fumbles and an interception. Westminster linebacker Mike Ruby recovered three of Georgetown's fumbles. The defense was aided when Georgetown running back Mitch Wilburn, the leading rusher in NAIA Division II with 1,340 yards, was injured in the second quarter and did not return to the game. Westminster running back Brad Tokar rushed for 115 yards and two touchdowns on 19 carries.

Quarterfinal at Tarleton State
On December 2, Westminster defeated , 34–0, in the NAIA Division II quarterfinals before a crowd of 3,650 at Memorial Stadium in Stephenville, Texas. Coach Joe Fusco credited his team with having "played consistently on offense and defense" and not making mistakes.

Semifinal at Central Washington
On December 9, Westminster, ranked No. 1, defeated No. 2 , 21–10, in the NAIA Division II semifinals at Ellensburg, Washington. Westminster quarterback completed 10 of 24 passes for 172 yards and a touchdown and also scored a rushing touchdown. With the victory, Westminster's winning streak reached 26 games.

Championship game vs. Wisconsin–La Crosse
On December 16, Westminster defeated , 51–30, in the national championship game before a crowd of 3,728 at Fawcett Stadium in Canton, Ohio. The victory extended Westminster's winning streak to 27 games. Westminster quarterback Joe Micchia completed 18 of 33 passes for 219 yards and four touchdowns. He finished his college career with a school-record 4,619 passing yards. Westminster cornerback Louis Berry scored the final points after intercepting a two-point conversion attempt and returning it 98 yards for two points.

References

Westminster
Westminster Titans football seasons
NAIA Football National Champions
College football undefeated seasons
Westminster Titans football